Cheraw is an unincorporated community in Marion County, Mississippi, United States.

History
Cheraw was founded in 1905, and named after Cheraw, South Carolina.

Reverend Isom Pounds and Margaret Parker Pounds were said to have co-founded the town when, following marriage, they relocated there from Cheraw, South Carolina in the early 1800s.

The word "Cheraw" references a tribe of indigenous peoples (Native Americans) who inhabited the Southeastern Woodlands region of the United States. Genealogical records indicate that Margaret Parker was of Cheraw decent.

References

Unincorporated communities in Marion County, Mississippi
Unincorporated communities in Mississippi
Mississippi placenames of Native American origin